The Ministry of Examination (MOEX) is a second level policy-making body, governed under the Examination Yuan of the Republic of China (Taiwan) and is the fundamental Examination Yuan agency responsible for the administration of national examinations and the supervision of contract examinations throughout Taiwan.

History 

The recruitment of civil servants is one key element in government personnel management and the recruitment through selective examinations has been a long-standing system in Chinese history. After the foundation of the Republic of China, the Examination Council was established in 1929 to oversee examination administration affairs. Following the promulgation of the Constitution, the Ministry was formally established on 21 July 1948.

Ministry structure
The Ministry is currently organized as follows:

 Department of Examination Planning
 Department of Junior & Senior Examinations
 Department of Special Examinations
 Department of Professional & Technical Examinations 
 Department of Question Bank Management
 Department of Information Management
 Department of General Affairs
 Secretariat
 Human Resources Office
 Accounting Office
 Statistics Office
 Ethics Office

Ministers

See also 
 Government of the Republic of China
 Examination Yuan
 Ministry of Civil Service (Taiwan)

References

External links 

 Official site

Examination Yuan
National civil service commissions
Examination
Ministries established in 1930
1930 establishments in China